Three steamships of the Horn Line carried the name Ingrid Horn.

, sold in 1903, sank in 1917 after collision with SS Bergvik.
, sold in 1928, scrapped in 1960.
, sold in 1939, bombed and sunk in 1944.

Ship names